Igor Sibaldi (Milan, Italy, 15 June 1957), born from Russian mother and Italian father, is an Italian writer, scholar of theology and history of religion.

Biography
Igor Sibaldi is the author of numerous works on the Scripture and shamanism. He regularly holds conferences and seminars in Italy and abroad about mythology, exegesis and depth psychology. He worked for a long time on angelology in Jewish tradition, equalizing it to an ancient form of psychology.

His favourite style is the essay-novel form. He has published, among the others,  The Invisible Teachers  (Mondadori)  The forbidden fruit of knowledge  (Frassinelli)  The Ark of the new Masters  (Frassinelli)  The invisible world  (Frassinelli)  Book of Angels  (Frassinelli) and new translations of Genesis (The Book of Creation,  Frassinelli) and the Gospel of John (The Gospel's Secret Code, Sperling and Kupfer).

Books
 I miracoli di Gesù e la tecnica dei miracoli nei Vangeli canonici (The Miracles of Jesus), (1988), Mondadori;
 La congiura (The Conspiracy), (1994), Mondadori;
 La trama dell'angelo (The Angel's Plot), (1995), Mondadori;
 I grandi peccatori. Breve storia della letteratura russa, (1996), Mondadori;
 I maestri invisibili (Invisible Teachers), (1997), Mondadori;
 La creazione dell'universo. La Genesi, (1999), Sperling & Kupfer;
 Il frutto proibito della conoscenza (The Forbidden Fruit of Knowledge), (2000), Frassinelli;
 Il mio principe azzurro, (2001), ES;
 Gli angeli dei bambini, (2002), Ape Junior;
 Il libro del giovane Giovanni. Il Vangelo secondo gli Spiriti Guida, (2003), Frassinelli;
 La Trama dell’Angelo, (2003), Anima;
 Iniziazione. Come incontrare i propri Maestri Invisibili, with DVD, (2005), Anima;
 Il codice segreto del Vangelo. Il libro del giovane Giovanni, (2005), Sperling & Kupfer;
 Gattoterapia. Gli esercizi, (2005), Salani;
 L' arca dei nuovi maestri. L'età dell'oro, (2006), Sperling & Kupfer;
 Il mondo invisibile (The Invisible World), (2006), Frassinelli;
 Libro degli angeli (The Book of Angels), (2007), Frassinelli;
 Quando hai perso le ali, (2008), Frassinelli;
 Istruzioni per gli angeli, with DVD, (2009), Tecniche Nuove;
 Libro della personalità (The Book of Personality), (2009), Frassinelli;
 Vocabolario. Le parole dei mondi più grandi, (2009), Anima;
 Il Libro delle Epoche. 2012 la fine del ciclo della ribellione, (2010), Frassinelli;
 Esegesi. Scopri la tua religione, with DVD, (2010), Anima;
 Esegesi 2. La bellezza delle eresie. Che cosa cambia, with DVD, (2010), Anima;
 Esegesi 3. L'anima e la civiltà. E noi cosa dobbiamo fare?, with DVD, (2011), Anima;
 Libro della creazione (The Book of Creation), (2011), Frassinelli;
 Esegesi 4. Il confine di Spacelandia. Accorgersi, with DVD, (2012), edito da Anima;
 Agenda degli Angeli, (2012), Frassinelli;
 Il tuo aldilà personale (Your Personal Beyond), (2012), Spazio Interiore;
 Pinocchio e la Qabbalah, with DVD, (2013), edito da Anima.

Translations and essays on Russian literature
 Aleksandr Blok, La baracca dei saltimbanchi, translation and introduction by Igor Sibaldi, in Sipario, agosto-settembre 1977;
 Aleksandr Blok, La Sconosciuta, translation and introduction by Igor Sibaldi, in Sipario, ottobre 1977;;
 Fëdor Dostoevskij, Netocka Nezvanova, translated by Igor Sibaldi, Serra e Riva, Milano 1979;
 Aleksej Remizov, Russia scompigliata, translation and introduction by Igor Sibaldi, Bompiani, Milano 1981;
 Aleksandr Blok, Gli ultimi giorni del regime zarista, translation and introduction by Igor Sibaldi, Editori Riuniti, Roma 1983, ;
 Vsevolod Ivanov, Il ritorno di Buddha, translation and introduction by di Igor Sibaldi, Editori Riuniti, Roma 1985, ;
 Jurij Tynjanov, Persona di cera, translation and introduction by Igor Sibaldi, Editori Riuniti, Roma 1986, ;
 Fëdor Dostoevskij, Memorie dal sottosuolo, translation and introduction by di Igor Sibaldi, Arnoldo Mondadori Editore, Milano 1987, ;
 Lev Tolstoj, Perché la gente si droga? e altri saggi su società, politica, religione, translation and introduction by Igor Sibaldi, Arnoldo Mondadori Editore, Milano 1988, ;
 Lev Tolstoj, Anna Karenina, introduction by Igor Sibaldi, Arnoldo Mondadori Editore, Milano 1989, ;
 Fëdor Dostoevskij, Romanzi brevi, in two volumes, edited and with an introduction by Igor Sibaldi, Arnoldo Mondadori Editore, Milano 1990, ;
 Michail Bulgakov, Il Maestro e Margherita, postface by Igor Sibaldi, Arnoldo Mondadori Editore, Milano 1991, ;
 Lev Tolstoj, Tutti i racconti, vol.1, edited and with translations and introduction by Igor Sibaldi, Arnoldo Mondadori Editore, Milano 1991, ;
 Lev Tolstoj, Tutti i racconti, vol.2, edited and with translations and introduction by Igor Sibaldi, Arnoldo Mondadori Editore, Milano 1991, ;
 Lev Tolstoj, Della vita, introduction by Igor Sibaldi, Arnoldo Mondadori Editore, Milano 1991, ;
 Lev Tolstoj, Romanzi brevi, edited and with an introduction by Igor Sibaldi, Arnoldo Mondadori Editore, Milano 1992, ;
 Lev Tolstoj, I racconti di Sebastopoli, introduction by Igor Sibaldi, Arnoldo Mondadori Editore, Milano 1993, ;
 Fëdor Dostoevskij, Povera gente, introduction by Igor Sibaldi, Arnoldo Mondadori Editore, Milano 1993, ;
 Lev Tolstoj, Chadzi-Murat, introduction by Igor Sibaldi, Arnoldo Mondadori Editore, Milano 1994, ;
 Fiabe siberiane, introduction by Igor Sibaldi, Arnoldo Mondadori Editore, Milano 1994, ;
 Fëdor Dostoevskij, I fratelli Karamazov, edited and with an introduction by Igor Sibaldi, Arnoldo Mondadori Editore, Milano 1994, ;
 Nikolaj Gogol', Le veglie nella masseria presso Dikan'ka, translated by Igor Sibaldi, in Nikolaj Gogol', Opere, vol.1, Arnoldo Mondadori Editore, Milano 1994, ;
 Nikolaj Gogol', Il Nevskij Prospèkt, translated by Igor Sibaldi, in Nikolaj Gogol', Opere, vol.1, Arnoldo Mondadori Editore, Milano 1994, ;
 Nikolaj Gogol', Il ritratto, translated by Igor Sibaldi, in Nikolaj Gogol', Opere, vol.1, Arnoldo Mondadori Editore, Milano 1994, ;
 Nikolaj Gogol', Le memorie di un pazzo, translated by Igor Sibaldi, in Nikolaj Gogol', Opere, vol.1, Arnoldo Mondadori Editore, Milano 1994, ;
 Nikolaj Gogol', Articoli da «Arabeschi», translated by Igor Sibaldi, in Nikolaj Gogol', Opere, vol.1, Arnoldo Mondadori Editore, Milano 1994, ;
 Lev Tolstoj, Il Vangelo spiegato ai giovani, translation and postface by Igor Sibaldi, Guanda, Parma 1995, ;
 Fëdor Dostoevskij, L'idiota, edited and with an introduction by Igor Sibaldi, Arnoldo Mondadori Editore, Milano 1995, ;
 Anton Cechov, La steppa e altri racconti, introduction by Igor Sibaldi, Arnoldo Mondadori Editore, Milano 1995, ;
 Anton Cechov, Il duello e altri racconti, introduction by Igor Sibaldi, Arnoldo Mondadori Editore, Milano 1995, ;
 Nikolaj Gogol', Passi scelti dalla corrispondenza con gli amici, translated by Igor Sibaldi, in Nikolaj Gogol', Opere, vol.2, Arnoldo Mondadori Editore, Milano 1996, ;
 Anton Cechov, Racconti, in due volumi, edited and with an introduction by Igor Sibaldi, Arnoldo Mondadori Editore, Milano 1996, ;
 Anton Cechov, L'omicidio e altri racconti, introduction by Igor Sibaldi, Arnoldo Mondadori Editore, Milano 1996, ;
 Anton Cechov, Il monaco nero e altri racconti, introduction byi Igor Sibaldi, Arnoldo Mondadori Editore, Milano 1996, ;
 Anton Cechov, La mia vita e altri racconti, introduction byi Igor Sibaldi, Arnoldo Mondadori Editore, Milano 1996, ;
 Lev Tolstoj, La tormenta e altri racconti, introduction by Igor Sibaldi, Arnoldo Mondadori Editore, Milano 1996, ;
 Lev Tolstoj, Polikuska e altri racconti, introduction by Igor Sibaldi, Arnoldo Mondadori Editore, Milano 1996, ;
 Lev Tolstoj, Lucerna e altri racconti, introduction by Igor Sibaldi, Arnoldo Mondadori Editore, Milano 1996, ;
 Lev Tolstoj, Racconti popolari e altri racconti, edited, translated and with an introduction by Igor Sibaldi, Arnoldo Mondadori Editore, Milano 1996, ;
 Lev Tolstoj, Guerra e pace, edited, translated and with an introduction by Igor Sibaldi, Arnoldo Mondadori Editore, Milano 1999.

References

External links
Sibaldi's Code (English-language Website)

1957 births
Living people
Italian Christian theologians